Maria Viktorovna, ("Viktorovna" is a patronym; her surname is not known) (born July 22, 1986), known professionally as Gentle Whispering ASMR, is a Russian-American ASMR performer and YouTube personality. Her YouTube videos are considered among the most well-known and popular in the ASMR genre.

Career 
Maria recalls her first ASMR experiences taking place while in kindergarten in central Russia, and says she felt similar relaxing and "ticklish" sensations throughout her life. In 2009, Maria had depression and anxiety during a divorce from her husband. While watching massage and meditation videos to relax, she clicked on a video of a woman whispering that was recommended by YouTube's suggestion algorithm. This video triggered the same relaxed feeling she had experienced in her youth, and she continued watching similar videos to relax. Maria recorded her own whisper video in February 2011, deleting it soon after. However, she continued recording and publishing new content; by the year's end she had amassed 30,000 subscribers.

In 2014, Maria was working as an administrative assistant in a medical office, but by 2015 she was earning enough to treat her content as a full-time job. Her channel reached one million subscribers in 2017, the first ASMR channel to do so.

One of Maria's videos was sampled in the 2014 song, "Terrors in My Head," by Canadian electronic musician Deadmau5.

Reception and style 
Maria's ASMR videos are recognized as among the best and most popular on YouTube. In separate articles for The Washington Post, feature writer Caitlin Gibson called Maria "the premier celebrity of a controversial but increasingly recognized phenomenon" in 2014 and "YouTube’s preeminent ASMRtist" in 2019. Maria has additionally been described as "queen of the ASMR genre," and "widely known as the grande dame of ASMR." Her videos have been recommended by Irish Independent and Thrillist.

Maria, herself, has said that she tries "to protrude a motherly, comforting atmosphere in my videos," and make her audience feel "safe and protected." She describes receiving thank-you messages from viewers with anxiety, stress, or sleep disorders.

Personal life 
Maria was born on July 22, 1986, in Russia. She gave birth to her first child in 2019, and as of February 2020 resides in El Dorado County, California. She is a certified massage therapist and formerly lived in Baltimore, Maryland.

References

External links 
 

Living people
1986 births
Russian YouTubers
Russian emigrants to the United States
American YouTubers
21st-century Russian women
Practitioners of autonomous sensory meridian response